The House of Vardanisdze was an aristocratic family in medieval Georgia, listed among the Great Nobles (didebuli) of the realm.

History 
The family is presumed to have branched off from another eminent Georgian feudal clan of the Marushisdze, a hypothesis supported by the abundance of the name Marushiani in the Vardanisdze family. The first attested member and arguably a founder of the family is Vardan, eristavi of the Svans, in the latter half of the 11th century. The dignity of eristavi (or eristavt-eristavi) of the Svans was hereditary in his descendants later known as Vardanisdze (Vardan + -dze, "a son"). They also held various important posts at the Georgian royal court, including mechurchlet-ukhutsesi (Lord High Treasurer), msakhurt-ukhutsesi (Lord Great Chamberlain) and mandaturt-ukhutsesi (Lord High Mandator) of Likht-Imereti (i.e., west Georgia).

Branches of the family 
The family gave origin to two important branches, the Dadiani of Mingrelia, and the Gurieli of Guria while in Svaneti they were replaced by the House of Gelovani.

References 

Families of Georgia (country)
Noble families of Georgia (country)